The New Brunswick and Canada Railway and Land Company was chartered in or prior to 1856 by Act of the New Brunswick Legislature. In that year, it took over the St. Andrews and Quebec Railway Company, which had been formed in 1836.

It acquired 10,000 acres for every mile built of a railroad between Fredericton and Trois-Rivieres; in other words, 1.6 million acres in total. The railway was leased to the Canadian Pacific Railway when the NBCRLC ran into financial difficulties, but its control remained of the land, which was leased in exchange of stumpage to various timber companies. The company was granted lands, among others, in the Restigouche River, the Miramichi River and the Tobique River watersheds, and it maintained a staff in Saint John, New Brunswick to oversee stumpage on its lands.

When, during World War II, the British owners decided to sell, the firms that held leases were asked to buy them by general manager W.E. Golding, but all refused for one reason or another. In January 1942 Fraser Companies of Edmundston bought 85,652 acres on the Green River for $3.50 per; while in March 1942 D'Auteuil Lumber Co. bought 40,000 acres in the region of St. Francis for $3.42 per; in 1943, Fraser Companies paid $3.18 per acre for a 627,840-acre tract; close to 176,000 acres were sold a month later on the Restigouche for $4.03 to an Irving company; again a month later, 30,248 acres were sold at $2.18 per to Flemming and Gibson, who had been the lessees of the tract in counties Victoria and Carleton. Yearly taxation at the time was $2 per acre.

Then, some time prior to March 1945, the company, with its remnant 698,000 acres, was bought outright by Irving for $1.2 million. The net cost to him per acre was $1.50.

References

Bibliography
 

Defunct New Brunswick railways